Syed Ahmed alKabir ibn eʿAlī al-Rifāʿī was a Sunni Muslim preacher, ascetic, mystic, jurist, and theologian, known for being the eponymous founder of the Rifaʽi tariqa (Sufi order) of Islam. He gave courses in Hadith, Fiqh, and Tafsir everyday except for Monday and Thursday. He sat in his pulpit afternoons on Monday and Thursday and preached to intellectuals and the public. The Rifaʽi order had its greatest following until it was overtaken by the Qadiri order. The Rifaʽi order is most commonly found in the Arab Middle East but also in Turkey, the Balkans and South Asia.

Biography
Shaykh Ahmed al-Kabir al-rifaiI was born in the Hasen Region of Wasit, Iraq, during the first half of Rajab of the lunar months. When he was seven years old, his father Sayyid Sultan Ali al-Batahi died in Baghdad. After that, his uncle Shaykh Mansur al-Rabbani al-Batahi took him under his protection and educated him.

Shaykh Syedi Ahmad al-Kabir was a Husayni Saiyed and his lineage is recorded as follows: He is Ahmad bin Ali, bin Yahya, bin Thabit, bin Ali, bin Ahmad al-Murtada, bin Ali, bin Hasan al-Asghar, bin Mahdi, bin Muhammad, bin Hasan al-Qasim, bin Husayn, bin Ahmad al-Salih al-Akbar, bin Musa al-Thani, bin Ibrahim al-Murtada, bin Musa al-Kazim, bin Ja'far al-Sadiq, bin Muhammad al-Baqir, bin Ali Zayn al-Abidin, bin Husayn, bin Ali bin Abi Talib and Fatimah al-Zahra, the daughter of Prophet Muhammad.

He learned the Quran from Shaykh Abd al-Sami al-Hurbuni in Hasen, his birthplace. He committed to memorising the whole of the Quran at the age of seven. During the same year, after the death of his father, his uncle Mansur al-Batahi transferred him and his family to Dikla region. There, his uncle sent him to Abu al-Fadl Ali al-Wasiti who was an expert in the canon law of Islam, a commentator on the Quran and a preacher.

On the other hand, when he was attending dhikr meetings of his uncle Shaykh Mansur al-Rabbani, he was also attending the courses of his other uncle Shaykh Abu Bakr who was a major scientific figure at the time. He memorised the book “Tanbih” concerning Fiqh (Muslim canonical jurisprudence) of Imam Al-Shafi'i which belongs to Shaykh al-Islam Imam Abu Ishaq Ibrahim ibn Ali al-Shirazi. He also wrote an explanation about such a book (however this explanation was lost during the Mongol invasions).

Furthermore, he dedicated his entire time to learning such religious knowledge to such an extent that eventually even his teachers respected him.

When he was twenty, Abu al-Fadl Ali, the Shaykh of Wasit province and his teacher, awarded him a “Sehadetname” (which represented writings of evidences including canonical law and order of dervish sciences), and a nickname that was the father of external and interior sciences, and also dressed him in his own dervish's cloak.

He stayed in Nahr-i Dikla for a short time and after that he came back to his father's public guest-house for travellers at Hasen during which time he became very famous. When he was twenty-eight, his uncle Shaykh Mansur bequeathed him to manage the dervish lodge and Caliphs after his death. He also commanded him to live in dervish lodge of Shaykh Yahya al-Najjari who was his grandfather from his mother side. It was during this time he began to preach in this dervish lodge. His uncle died in the year of the bequeathing. When he was thirty-five, the number of his murids was over seven hundred thousand.

He did not neglect teaching the Sunnah of Prophet Muhammad and the details of the Quran to the public as he always believed that the trade of a wise man was to show the way towards Allah, the only God.

There is an information in the book which is called “Sawad al-Aynayn” of Imam Abu al-Qasim Abdul Karim al-Rafi'i al-Qawzini. The writer says that:

“Shaykh Salih Yusuf Abu Zakariya al-Asqalani, who was a great expert in the canon law of Islam, had told me that: I had gone to Umm Obayd to visit Shaykh Ahmad al-Rifai. More than one hundred thousand people crowded around the guesthouse, some people were managers, scientists, shaykhs and the other members of the public. He provided dinner to all of them and was very friendly to everyone. He started to preach in the afternoon of a Thursday. Preachers of Wasit province, a religious community from doctors of Muslim theology of Iraq and the important people of the province attended the preach meeting. One group of them asked for science of commentary on the Quran, the other group asked for subjects interested with record of sayings of the Prophet Muhammad, the other group asked for Muslim canonical jurisprudence, another group asked for the disagreement between the different religious opinions, and the other groups asked too many questions about different sections of science. He answered more than two hundred questions, and he experienced no anger during his answering of questions. I became embarrassed because of the insensitiveness of people asking questions, and I stood up and told them that; “Is this not enough for you? He will answer all questions about the written sciences, not facing any difficulty, with the permission of Allah.” Because of my words, he smiled and said to me; “Abu Zakariya, allow them to ask before they lose me. Certainly, the world is a house which will become absent. Allah changes whole situations every time.” The people cried because of his answer. The meeting was confused, worried sounds were heard. Forty thousands people became students of him with the spiritual effect of his talk.”

Ahmad al-Rifai's talks, his moves, his behaviours, and his every breath were for Allah. He always had a smiling face, and he was modest, good-tempered, tolerant, and patient. He didn't become cross with anyone and didn't want any help for his own personality. On the contrary, he loves for Allah, and angers for Allah. He didn't rebuke somebody whose behaviour he didn't like. He doesn't see his family and himself superior to other people. Even he said about this subject that; “According to our opinion for Allah, everybody is equal to each other, it doesn't matter if they are close relatives or unknown people for us.”

He used to want from people to protect themselves from overusing the things that were neither recommended nor forbidden by religious law like overeating and oversleeping. He used to recommend doing worship during the nights. Furthermore, he also used to recommend being far away from people who don't know their limit, behave in excessive manner, see themselves superior to others and dispute each other.

He used to do his services by himself, repair his shoes, carry the firewood prepared for him to the house of people who are sick, orphan, fallen and without relations or friends.

He used to turn shoes of blinds, and also take them to the place they wanted to go. Not only that, but he used to respect old people and recommend respecting them.

He used to go to the house of leprous and bedridden people, wash their clothes, bring their meal, sit and eat with them, and wanted them to pray for him. When he heard of a patient who was in a far city, he would visit them. He also cured wounded animals, and he said that; “To compass the creatures of Allah is one of the reasons that human being are close to Allah.”

He used to behave very mercifully to orphans, cry for poor people, grow merry with their joy, behave with them with modesty, see himself like one of them and say in meetings that; “If a whole craft-owner is a count and every craft-owner passes in groups, I prefer to become a poor in the groups of poor.”

Great people of his era said that; “The most important reasons for Ahmad al-Rifa'i reaching his great place is his great mercy to all creatures and his looking down to himself.”

He used to respect the wise and experts in the canon law of Islam and wanted everybody to respect them by teaching that; “The wise are the leaders and fundamentals of the community.”

He had withdrawn from the world. Furthermore, he did not store any commodity at any time. Although he possessed big wealth, he did not wear two sets of clothes at the same time, neither in the summer nor in the winter. His movable and immovable property was much more than property of governors and famous rich men. He used to distribute the revenue of his real estate to dervishes and people who came to dervish convents. He did not leave any commodities to his children.

See also 
 List of Sufis
 List of Ash'aris and Maturidis
 List of Muslim theologians

Shafi'is
Asharis
Mujaddid
Sunni imams
Sunni Sufis
Sunni Muslim scholars of Islam
Iraqi Sufi religious leaders
Iraqi Sufis
Iraqi Sufi saints
Rifa'i order
12th-century jurists
1118 births
1119 births
1182 deaths
1180s deaths